Vindö was a little boat yard on the Swedish west coast, situated between Orust and the mainland outside Uddevalla. The yard was best known for their small wooden boats in the 1960s, and converted to GRP material in 1965. This was shortly followed by the first of many bankruptcies, and the yard stopped production of new boats in 1990.

There has also been the Vindö 70 (which not was a traditional Vindö), 65 and 90 but these had limited production volume.

Of earlier boats the Vindö 18, 22, 28 and 30 are to be mentioned.

References 

Swedish boat builders
Boat builders